Zen and the Art of Motorcycle Maintenance: An Inquiry into Values is a book by Robert M. Pirsig first published in 1974. It is a work of fictionalized autobiography and is the first of Pirsig's texts in which he explores his concept of Quality.

The title is an apparent play on the title of the 1948 book Zen in the Art of Archery by Eugen Herrigel. In its introduction, Pirsig explains that, despite its title, "it should in no way be associated with that great body of factual information relating to orthodox Zen Buddhist practice. It's not very factual on motorcycles, either."  

Pirsig received 121 rejections before an editor finally accepted the book for publication—and he did so thinking it would never generate a profit. It was subsequently featured on best-seller lists for decades, with initial sales of at least 5 million copies worldwide.

Structure
The book is a fictionalized autobiography of a 17-day journey that Pirsig made on his Honda CB77 motorcycle from Minnesota to Northern California along with his son Chris in 1968. The story of this journey is recounted in a first-person narrative, although the author is not identified. Father and son are also accompanied, for the first nine days of the trip, by close friends John and Sylvia Sutherland, with whom they part ways in Montana. 

The trip is punctuated by numerous philosophical discussions, referred to as Chautauquas by the author, on topics including epistemology, the history of philosophy, and the philosophy of science.

Many of these discussions are tied together by the story of the narrator's own past self, who is referred to in the third person as Phaedrus (after Plato's dialogue). Phaedrus, a teacher of creative and technical writing at Montana State College, became engrossed in the question of what defines good writing, and what in general defines good, or "Quality", which he understands similar to Tao. Phaedrus's philosophical investigations eventually drove him insane, and he was subjected to electroconvulsive therapy, which permanently changed his personality.

Towards the end of the book, Phaedrus's strong and unorthodox personality, presented as dangerous to the narrator, begins to re-emerge and the narrator is reconciled with his past.

Writing
In a 1974 interview with National Public Radio, Pirsig stated that the book took him four years to write. During two of these years, Pirsig continued working at his job of writing computer manuals. This caused him to fall into an unorthodox schedule, waking up very early and writing Zen from 2 a.m. until 6 a.m., then eating and going to his day job. He would sleep during his lunch break and then go to bed around 6 in the evening. Pirsig joked that his co-workers noticed that he was "a lot less perky" than everyone else.

Themes

Philosophical content
It has been noted that Pirsig's romantic/classical dichotomy resembles Nietzsche's Dionysian/Apollonian dichotomy as described in The Birth of Tragedy. For example, in his book The Person of the Therapist, Edward Smith writes, "In his popular novel ... Pirsig  also addressed the Apollonian and Dionysian worldviews, naming them respectively classical understanding and romantic understanding."

The self and relationships
Beverly Gross (1984) writes that Pirsig is seeking a synthesis of "the normal, everyday, functioning self with the person given to extremes, excesses, dizzying heights, obsessions—our crazy self with our sane self, the greatness in us with our ordinariness". The exceptional in the narrator is represented by Phaedrus, who, despite the narrator's attempt to keep him in the past, pushes to the foreground of his mind toward the book's end, threatening the narrator's stability and relationship with his son. However, the narrator's difficulties with his son during the journey also question whether giving up parts of himself in exchange for "sanity" has even helped this relationship. Gross writes, "He relates to mechanical things, not to people. There is beauty in his recognition that personality inheres in motorcycles, riding gloves; there is sadness and sickness in his removal from the personality of people, his own most notably". The Chautauquas, which emphasize the narrator's tendency toward solitary thought and over-analysis, may reflect his avoidance of the problems before him: his relationships and the resurrection of Phaedrus. To the extent that the narrator denies Phaedrus, the Chautauquas are practical, but when he decides that he will admit himself to hospital again, he realizes the undeniable presence of Phaedrus in him, and the Chautauquas are given over to those more abstruse topics.

Gumption traps
According to the author, A gumption trap is an event or mindset that can cause a person to lose enthusiasm and become discouraged from starting or continuing a project. The word "gumption" denotes a combination of common sense, shrewdness, and a sense of initiative. Although the last of these traits is the primary victim of the "gumption trap," the first two suffer indirectly in that a reduction in initiative results in a reduction in constructive activity and therefore inhibits one's development of the first two traits. Pirsig goes on to inform his readers that the "trap" portion of the term refers to the positive feedback loop that the event or mindset creates: the reduction in the person's enthusiasm and initiative decreases both the person's likelihood of success in that project and the degree of success likely, thus doubly affecting the expected outcome of the person's efforts. The usual result further discourages the person, whether it be a mere lack of success or a bigger outright failure complete with embarrassment and loss of the resources initially invested.

The specific term "gumption trap" was coined by Pirsig, and the associated concept plays an important part in the practical application of his Metaphysics of Quality.

Types

Pirsig refers to two types of gumption traps: setbacks, which arise from external/"exogenous" events, and hang-ups, which are the product of internal/"endogenous" factors such as a poor fit between one's psychological state and the requirements of a project.

Setbacks
The nature of setbacks can vary considerably.  For example, a minor setback might result from a minor injury.  Larger setbacks include the lack of knowledge that a certain procedural step or other condition is necessary for a project's success:  If one attempts to keep working despite the lack of knowledge that this obstacle exists (let alone how to deal with it), one's lack of progress may prompt one to take long breaks from the project, to focus one's attention on other endeavors, or even to lose interest in the project altogether.  Pirsig suggests preventing these kinds of gumption traps by being slow and meticulous, taking notes that might help later, and troubleshooting in advance (e.g., by laying out the requirements for one's project in logical and/or conceptual order and looking for procedural problems ranging from unaccounted-for prerequisites to gaps in one's instructions or plans).

Hang-ups
Hang-ups stem from internal factors that can get in the way of starting or completing a project.  Examples of such hang-ups include anxiety, boredom, impatience, and the failure (often borne of excessive egotism) to realize that a) one might not have all the information necessary to succeed and/or b) certain aspects of the problem might be more or less important than one believes. Dealing with hang-ups can be as simple as reducing hyperfocus on a specific aspect of a problem by taking a short break from working on the problem or that specific aspect of it.

Pirsig notes several aspects of hang-ups.

 Affective (i.e. receptive or dynamic) understanding or "value traps": these can be described generally as an inability or reluctance to re-evaluate notions due to a commitment to previous values. On the whole these types of issues can be addressed by (1) rediscovering facts as they arise; (2) recognizing that the facts are available and apparent; (3) deliberately slowing down to allow unstructured processing of information; and (4) reassessing the weight attached to the current knowledge.
 Egotism may encourage one to believe misleading information or disbelieve a potentially inconvenient fact. Appropriate recourses include humility, modesty, attentiveness and skepticism.
 Anxiety may preclude the confidence necessary to begin a project or the self-assurance needed to patiently work through a project systematically. Appropriate recourses include research, study and preparation prior to beginning the project; detailing the anticipated steps required to accomplish the task; and understanding the personhood and fallibility of professionals.
 Boredom may cause sloppy work and inattention to detail. Appropriate recourses include taking a break to allow interest in the project to rebuild or ritualizing common practices. Pirsig notes that at the first sign of boredom, it is important to stop work immediately.
 Impatience, like boredom, may cause sloppy work and inattention to detail. Appropriate recourses include allowing indefinite time for the project and value flexibility to rediscover aspects of the project.

 Cognitive understanding or "truth traps": these can be described as misunderstanding the feedback of a given action.
 Reliance on yes-no duality may cause misinterpretation of results. Pirsig notes the concept of mu and suggests the answer to a particular question may indicate that the question does not match the situation. An appropriate recourse may be to reconsider the context of the inquiry.

 Psychomotor behavior or "muscle traps": these surround the interaction of the environment, machinist and machine.
 Inadequate tools may lead to a feeling of frustration. Appropriate recourses include proper equipment acquisition.
 Environmental factors may lead to frustration including inadequate lighting, temperature extremes and physically uncomfortable positions.
 Muscular insensitivity or lack of proprioception may lead to a disproportionate amount of force being applied to a material that leads to frustration. Misunderstanding of different tolerances of various materials may lead to broken parts or inadequate tension.

Reception
At the time of its publication, Christopher Lehmann-Haupt, in his book review for The New York Times, wrote,

I now regret that I lack the expertise in philosophy to put Mr. Pirsig's ideas to a proper test, for this book may very well be a profoundly important one—a great one even—full of insights into our most perplexing contemporary dilemmas. I just don't know. But whatever its true philosophical worth, it is intellectual entertainment of the highest order.

Since then, Zen and the Art of Motorcycle Maintenance has become the best-selling philosophy book of all time.

See also

 Dehumanized
 Lila: An Inquiry into Morals
 Quality (philosophy)
 Pirsig's metaphysics of Quality

References

External links
 Audio: 1992 NPR Interview with Pirsig
 Guardian interview from 2006: Short version and Long version

1974 books
American autobiographical novels
American philosophical novels
Motorcycle writing
Motorcycling in fiction
Robert M. Pirsig
Technology neologisms
Western United States in fiction
William Morrow and Company books
Works by Robert M. Pirsig